The silver-stripe round herring, slender sprat, or Kibinago minnow (Spratelloides gracilis) is a small, herring-like forage fish. They are small fish used as fishing bait, especially in skipjack tuna-fishing. It is valued as food in Japan, where it is known as kibinago. These can be eaten raw, as sashimi, or cooked, as whitebait.

References

silver-stripe round herring
silver-stripe round herring